Jean-Louis Beaumont (10 November 1925 – 31 August 2013) was a French politician.

Beaumont was born in Paris on 10 November 1925.

He defeated incumbent mayor of Saint-Maur-des-Fossés Gilbert Noël in 1977, and remained in office until 2008, choosing not to run for reelection that year. Beaumont served on the National Assembly from 1978 to 1981 as a non-inscrit representing Val-de-Marne. He served his second term as a deputy from 1993 to 1997 representing Val-de-Marne's 1st constituency while affiliated with the Union for French Democracy, losing reelection to Henri Plagnol, an adviser of his municipal government. Beaumont died at home in Saint-Maur-des-Fossés on 31 August 2013, aged 87.

References

1925 births
2013 deaths
21st-century French politicians
20th-century French physicians
Deputies of the 6th National Assembly of the French Fifth Republic
Deputies of the 10th National Assembly of the French Fifth Republic
Mayors of places in Île-de-France
Union for French Democracy politicians
Politicians from Paris